Lockstep is a kind of marching that involves all marcher's legs moving in the same way at the same time.

Lockstep or lock step may also refer to:

 Lockstep (computing), a term used in fault-tolerant computing
 Lockstep protocol, a protocol that tackles the look-ahead cheating problem in peer-to-peer gaming networks
 Lockstep compensation, a form of employee compensation based purely on seniority
 Lock step (dance move), dance steps which involve the "locking" of the moving foot
 Lockstep, a science fiction book written by Karl Schroeder